The 2014 Labatt United States Women's Curling Championship was held from March 1 to 8 at the IceWorks Skating Complex in Philadelphia, Pennsylvania. It was held in conjunction with the 2014 United States Men's Curling Championship.

Road to the Nationals

A total of ten teams will be able to participate in the women's national championship by qualifying through the High Performance Program, through the World Curling Tour Order of Merit, or through a challenge round.

Teams
There will be ten teams participating in this year's national championship. The teams are listed as follows:

Notes
 Coleman sat out due to illness for Draws 3 and 4, and Stolt replaced Coleman at the skip position. Coleman returned to play in Draw 5. She played as second in Draws 5–7, and played third in Draws 8 and 9, swapping positions with LeBeau.
 The team's locale is listed as Seattle, Washington, based on the locale of the original skip of the team, Good. Coleman is from San Francisco, California, and Stolt, the team's alternate, is from Plymouth, Minnesota.

Round-robin standings
Final round-robin standings

Round-robin results
All draw times are listed in Eastern Standard Time (UTC−7).

Draw 1
Saturday, March 1, 4:30 pm

Draw 2
Sunday, March 2, 8:00 am

Draw 3
Sunday, March 2, 4:00 pm

Draw 4
Monday, March 3, 12:00 pm

Draw 5
Monday, March 3, 8:00 pm

Draw 6
Tuesday, March 4, 12:00 pm

Draw 7
Tuesday, March 4, 8:00 pm

Draw 8
Wednesday, March 5, 12:00 pm

Draw 9
Wednesday, March 5, 8:00 pm

Tiebreaker
Thursday, March 6, 12:00 pm

Playoffs

1 vs. 2
Thursday, March 6, 8:00 pm

3 vs. 4
Thursday, March 6, 8:00 pm

Semifinal
Friday, March 7, 4:00 pm

Final
Saturday, March 8, 10:00 am

References

External links

2014 in curling
2014
2014 in sports in Pennsylvania
2014 in American sports
United States Women's Curling Championship
2014
Women's curling competitions in the United States
Curling in Pennsylvania